The Immediate Gratification Players (IGP) are a collegiate improvisational comedy troupe based out of Harvard College. They specialize in long form, free-form improvisation and are recognized as one of the top college troupes in the nation.

History
The Immediate Gratification Players were founded by Harvard freshmen in the fall of 1986. The Immediate Gratification Players do not charge for admission to their on-campus shows. Their red-and-yellow striped ties are one of the troupe's hallmarks.

Each year, the Immediate Gratification Players host the Laugh Riot improvisational comedy festival at the American Repertory Theater. The invitational festival, begun in the spring of 1999 and now entering its 20th year, includes troupes from other colleges, including Cornell, Wesleyan University, and Columbia University. On the weekend of the annual Harvard-Yale football game, the Immediate Gratification Players either host or travel to a show which also stars an improvisational comedy troupe from Yale. Along with on-campus shows, they also play at Boston's Improv Asylum and at comedy clubs in New York City. Beyond the northeast, the Immediate Gratification Players have played in Florida, Los Angeles, Texas, Chicago, San Francisco, and London.

Apart from a traditional long form, free-form, the Immediate Gratification Players annually perform shows in specialty forms such as the “dinner party” and “radio show” formats. In 2007, they were selected out of the numerous Boston-based improv troupes to star in several comedy sketches produced by the Boston Globe in its Peter Post etiquette section. In 2010, they were selected to roast Wyclef Jean when he was named Artist of the Year by the Harvard Foundation. Shakira was honored in 2011 as the Harvard Foundation Artist of the Year, and again the Immediate Gratification Players were asked to roast her. The Immediate Gratification Players continued working with the Harvard Foundation, roasting John Legend in 2012 when he was named Artist of the Year The following year in 2013, they roasted Nicole Scherzinger, also a recipient of the Artist of the Year award. In 2014, the Harvard Foundation honored LL Cool J as Artist of the Year, and once again, IGP got a chance to participate in the celebrity roast. In 2015, IGP participated in the roast of Eva Longoria, recipient of the Harvard Foundation Artist of the Year award.

Immediate Gratification Player of the Year 

In 2010, the Immediate Gratification Players began honoring great comedians with a background in improvisational comedy as their Immediate Gratification Player of the Year. The award is not strictly annual, with the troupe's leader remarking that the group is "hoping to give this award as much as possible, devaluing it to the point where it basically means nothing." The award recipient performs the monologue portion of an Armando form show, where several scenes are based on the themes brought up in the monologue, which itself is formed from a crowd suggestion. Upon completion of the show, the honoree receives their own red-and-yellow striped tie.

The inaugural award recipient was comedian Jeff Garlin of Curb Your Enthusiasm and WALL-E fame. Garlin later wore his necktie on an episode of Curb Your Enthusiasm.

In 2011, Wayne Brady of ABC's Whose Line Is It Anyway was named the second Immediate Gratification Player of the Year.

First book

In December 2010, the troupe released its first published book, an improv how-to guide aimed at students, entitled “So You Think You’re Funny: A Students’ Guide to Improv Comedy.” The book was published by Meriwether Publishing, which is known for other comedy publications such as "Truth in Comedy" by Del Close.

Notable alumni

See also

Improvisational theatre
List of improvisational theatre companies
List of improvisational theater festivals

References

External links
 The Immediate Gratification Players – A Harvard Improv Troupe

Harvard University
Improvisational troupes
American comedy troupes
Performing groups established in 1986
University performing groups
1986 establishments in Massachusetts